Robert Boston (born December 7, 1962) is Senior Adviser for Americans United for Separation of Church and State and Editor of Church & State magazine. He has worked at Americans United since 1987, and formerly served as Assistant Director of Communications and Assistant Editor of Church & State as well as Director of Communications.  Boston is an advocate of separation of church and state and has authored four books on the subject.  He frequently appears on television and radio. Prominent media appearances include CNN, NBC Nightly News, Fox News Channel's The O'Reilly Factor and MSNBC's Countdown with Keith Olbermann.

In addition to his monthly contributions to Church & State magazine, Boston has written articles for Free Inquiry, The Humanist, Public Eye, Liberty, Jewish Monthly and other publications. He is frequently quoted in the print media on church-state topics, and often delivers public lectures before various audiences. Boston serves on the Advisory Board of Secular Coalition for America and offers advice to the coalition on the acceptance and inclusion of nontheism in American life. He also serves on the Board of Directors of the American Humanist Association.

Biography
Boston was born into a large family in Altoona, Pennsylvania, and graduated from Altoona Area High School in 1980.  He received his journalism degree from Indiana University of Pennsylvania, graduating in 1985. He and his wife live in Maryland. They have two children.

Bibliography

Why the Religious Right Is Wrong About Separation of Church & State (Prometheus Books, 1993), revised second edition (Prometheus Books, 2003) 
The Most Dangerous Man in America? Pat Robertson and the Rise of the Christian Coalition (Prometheus Books, 1996) 
Close Encounters with the Religious Right: Journeys Into the Twilight Zone of Religion and Politics (Prometheus Books, 2000) 
Taking Liberties: Why Religious Freedom Doesn't Give You The Right To Tell Other People What To Do (Prometheus Books, 2014)

References

External links
Articles by Rob Boston, TheFreeLibrary.com
Wall of Separation: Rob Boston entries, Americans United blog

1962 births
Living people
People from Altoona, Pennsylvania
Activists from Pennsylvania